Ivars Punnenovs (born May 30, 1994) is a Latvian professional ice hockey goaltender currently playing for the Lausanne HC of the National League (NL).

Playing career
Punnenovs began his career in 2013–14 as the backup goalie of Rapperswil-Jona Lakers behind David Aebischer. He made his National League A debut on September 27, 2013.

International play
Punnenovs participated at the 2013 World Junior Ice Hockey Championships as a member of the Latvia men's national junior ice hockey team.

References

External links

1994 births
Living people
Ice hockey people from Riga
Latvian ice hockey goaltenders
Lausanne HC players
SC Rapperswil-Jona Lakers players
SCL Tigers players
Ice hockey players at the 2022 Winter Olympics
Olympic ice hockey players of Latvia